Mallinder is a surname. Notable people with the surname include:

Harry Mallinder (born 1996), English rugby union player
Jim Mallinder (born 1966), English rugby union player and coach
Stephen Mallinder (born 1955), English musician

See also
Mallinger
Millinder